Carrion Crawler/The Dream is the twelfth studio album by San Francisco-based garage rock band Thee Oh Sees. It was released on November 8, 2011, by In the Red Records. Despite the running time of the album being comparable or greater than most of their other full-length releases, the vinyl editions state that it is an EP.

Background
Petey Dammit, the band's bassist, claimed that the album "was completely recorded live. 1, 2, 3, press record, go." Brigid Dawson stated that it was recorded over a five-day period. Chris Woodhouse, a frequent collaborator and mix engineer for the band, recorded the album at The Hangar recording studio in Sacramento, CA. John Dwyer, describing the album's sound, said: “As I’m sure most would agree, 'Castlemania' was more of a vocal tirade. This one’s meant to pummel and throb.” The second track is a medley of an original song called "Contraption" with a cover of the song "Soul Desert" by Can. "Contraption" had previously been released as a demo on Singles Vol. 1 + 2. Lars Finberg of the band The Intelligence joined Thee Oh Sees as a second drummer on this recording. The band dedicated the album to the memory of Jerry Fuchs, Jay Reatard, and Gerard Smith.

The album's title was taken from the titles of the first and sixth songs on the album. A "Carrion Crawler" is a centipede-like monster from the Dungeons and Dragons series of roleplaying games. Petey Dammit stated that the album was originally based around "The Dream", but after the band created the song "Carrion Crawler", John Dwyer decided to add its name to the album's title. The songs are completely separate other than their use together as the album's name.

In 2011, Burger Records released a series of cassette tapes by Thee Oh Sees that contained two full-length albums on each cassette. Carrion Crawler/The Dream was paired with the band's other main release from 2011, Castlemania.

Track listing

Personnel
 Petey Dammit - bass
 Brigid Dawson - backing vocals, keyboards
 John Dwyer- lead vocals, guitar 
 Lars Finberg - drums
 Mike Shoun - drums

Credits
 Chris Woodhouse - engineering
 Elzo Durt- artwork
 Tardon Feathered- mastering

References

2011 albums
Oh Sees albums